Kelvin Moore is a former Australian rules footballer in the Victorian Football League for Hawthorn.

Kelvin Moore may also refer to:

 Kelvin Moore (footballer, born 1984), former Australian rules footballer for Richmond
 Kelvin Moore (baseball) (1957 - 2014), Major League Baseball player